In investment banking, an underwriting contract is a contract between an underwriter and an issuer of securities.

The following types of underwriting contracts are the most common:

 In the firm commitment contract, the underwriter guarantees the sale of the issued stock at the agreed-upon price. For the issuer, it is the safest but the most expensive type of the contracts, since the underwriter takes the risk of sale.
 In the best efforts contract, the underwriter agrees to sell as many shares as possible at the agreed-upon price.
 Under the all-or-none contract, the underwriter agrees either to sell the entire offering or to cancel the deal.

Stand-by underwriting, also known as strict underwriting or old-fashioned underwriting is a form of stock insurance: the issuer contracts the underwriter for the latter to purchase the shares the issuer failed to sell under stockholders' subscription and applications.

References

Initial public offering
Contract law
Underwriting